Cabo Corrientes is a cape on the Pacific coast of Colombia in the Chocó Department.

Cabo Corrientes is at the southern end of the Gulf of Tribugá.
The cape divides the Esmeraldes-Pacific Colombia mangroves ecoregion into two large zones, one to the north and the other to the south.

Cabo Corrientes is close to Nuquí, to the north, where the government is planning to build a major port.

Notes

Sources

Headlands of Colombia